Duo Zikr is a vocal duo which  uses classic vocal technique, antique Tibet vibration techniques and, originally, Slavic Folk and Religious singing.

Origins
Duo Zikr is the duet of vocal improvisations of Igor Silin and Olga Tkachenko - the only Magic Theatre of Voice in the world whose art compels the audience to experience the whole range of human emotions. “Zikr” is Arabian for “Prayer” – a spiritual practice aimed at revelation of an internal sense of divine presence. The Art of Igor and Olga unites profound philosophy and unique combinations of vocal techniques with chamber and folk vocals, Tibetan Mantra vocal techniques, Tuvan guttural singing, Sufi Zikr, Orthodox rites and more. The vocal range of the duet composes 4 octaves.

In yet 25 years of creative activity Duo Zikr has cut over 30 discs, held concerts almost in every part of the world, and cooperated with many famous musicians: among them Boris Grebenshikov, Sergei Kurekhin, Andrei Samsonov, and Givan Gasparian.

Viacheslav Zaytsev, the famous Russian couturier, has designed original stage costumes exclusively for the Duo and now plans to hold a fashion show accompanied by music of the magic theatre of voice. The voices of Igor Silin and Olga Tkachenko, according to him, “Calls up Stone Age-old associations, when there weren’t defined scales to play, in a time when the voice echoed the sound of water, rustle of leaves and peals of thunder...”

Duo Zikr was created in the early 1990s within the walls of “The Fireflower” drama school of Igor Silin (Kalinauskas), where Olga Tkachenko was mastering a unique vocal technique based on mantra singing elaborated by Igor. After Igor had realized the natural vocal talent and striking capacity for work of his apprentice he offered Olga to sing a whole performance together.

The opening performance of the magic theatre took place in 1993 in St. Petersburg at Smolny Cathedral. The debut of the Duo with no playbills placarded gathered about 1000 spectators!

Fifteen compact discs have been made together with the famous Russian sound producer Yuri Morozov, and two albums were cut on vinyl - and symbolically one of them “The Mystery of the Cup” became the very last vinyl disk produced by the renowned Soviet record company “Melodia”. The albums “To the Beginning of Times” and “To the Twilight of Times” were recorded in France on the invitation of Daniel Kenzo, a European saxophonist.

Boris Grebenshikov (mantra), Givan Gasparian (duduk) and the world-known percussion player and Grammy-award-winner Evelyn Glennie (who worked with Bjork) participated in the recording of “Premonitions of the Shooting Star” - one of recent joint creations of Duo Zikr and sound producer Andrei Samsonov. The music from the latter became a soundtrack for an episode from the movie series about world cultures and religions “India in Real Time”, directed by cinematographer Sergei Debizhev.

Soloists of the Magic Theatre of Voice fruitfully cooperated with Sergei Kurekhin and jointly participated in Berlin Independence Days festival in Germany and also took part in the last work of the musician “The Pop-Mechanics” called “Three Steps in Rave”.

Mstislav Rastropovich and Galina Vishnevskaya were amazed and deeply moved by the vocal improvisations of Igor and Olga when they came to their concert. When the concert had finished the Duo received “blessings” of these great musicians.

The Duo has produced some striking videos which were recognized at various contests. For instance “The Road to Katmandu” shot under the direction of Fedor Bondarchuk got the prize at “Pokolenie-98” (“Generation-98”) music clips festival. Ms. Irina Taymanova, production director and musician, made a 20-minute long movie about duo Zikr called “The Wandering of Souls” that received the grand-prix of “The Velvet Season” international festival.

One rare event when the soloists of the Magic Theatre of Voice sang concrete words instead of spontaneous syllables and sounds was the soundtrack to “The Song about the Cheese Spirit” , an animated cartoon by famous fable of Aesop “The Fox and the Crow”.

Igor and Olga enjoy live concerts where they create more and more new tunes.

The Duo has performed concerts in the USA, France, Italy, England, Finland, Slovakia, Israel, Australia and other places around the globe. It has been featured several times at the international sound recording and music market MIDEM in Cannes and Hong Kong.

Ms. Tkachenko and Mr. Silin have long history of performing in Roman Catholic Churches and temples where, according to them, “You can perceive the music of the Duo the best”.

Jim Bessman, special correspondent for BILLBOARD magazine (NY, USA) - “Apart from dynamic improvisations making the visitors experience unique feelings, there is one more thing about the Duo. That is an astonishing attraction of the passion in the very voices and the manner of the performing”.

In 2007 Igor and Olga launched an experimental project that later on had grown to a full-scale music band called FireVoices. The sextet of male singers has been learning Duo Zikr’s unique vocal technique (“Freevoice”) and individually as well as jointly with the duet they have staged over 50 concerts in France, Czech Republic, Lithuania, Cyprus, Russian and Ukraine.

Like their founders the band performs a capella, but they can use music instruments for the shows as well. The FireVoices perform not just as a music band, but also as a theater. They have staged some drama plays (“Fall in Love” by Lesya Ukrainka’s novels, “Tonight” a modern interpretation of two classical pieces - Romeo & Juliette and West Side Story, “Jesus Christ Super Star” variation of Webber’s musical).

Biography

Olga Tkachenko
Olga completed the course at Kyiv-based Institute of Dramatic Art named after Karpenko-Kary. Joined the theater in kyiv and worked there for some time. Meeting with Igor Kalinauskas defined her further destiny. In the beginning she used to take part in the dramatic plays of Igor's drama studio called the Fireflower. While her work there Olga mastered a unique technique.

Igor Silin
Igor Kalinauskas (Silin is his stage-name) graduated with honors from the drama school named after Schukin, Directing faculty, in Moscow. He used to work as a director in Minsk, Astrakhan, Izhevsk, Moscow, Kyiv having produced 68 plays altogether. Igor is the author of a unique psychotechnique initially elaborated for actors and later on widely applied in many areas.

1000 Friends of Duo Zikr club
The crowdfunding club was established in late 2016 as an attempt to help duo Zikr's concert managers throughout Europe to pool funds together and ensure as many events as possible!
Club's official page can be found on Facebook (see ref below).

Discography 
 Pulsar (2015)
 Sky's Jump (2014)
 Ocean (2013)
 2000 years passed: faces faded, light remained (2012)
 Magic River (2012)
 Voice Message (2008)
 The Breath of Space (2008)
 Angels in the city (2008)
 Premonitions of a Shooting (2007)
 Sound of Magic (2007)
 Soul in the arms of God (2005)
 Happy happy Crazy (2005)
 Spring Journey (2005)
 Place of Power (2004)
 Mystery of the Fire (2003)
 In Search of Light - disk 1, Our century (2001)
 In Search of Light - disk 2, A journey to the love (2001)
 Free Flight (2000)
 Duo Zikr (1998)
 The Wandering of souls (1998)
 To the twilight of times (1998)
 To the beginning of times (1998)
 The Wormwood star (1996)
 Vertical Section (1996)
 Creation of the World (1996)
 Time that Dances (1996)
 Mystery of the Cup (1994)
 Voices (1994)

Awards and Festivals 
Duo Zikr has taken part in various international music festivals
 SyncSummit 2014, Paris, France 
 MIDEM 2013, Cannes, France 
 MIDEM 2011, Cannes, France
 MIDEM 2010, Canes, France
 BID, Berlin, Germany
 Christmas meetings in the Northern Palmira, St. Petersburg, Russia
 MANIFECTI, Turku, Finland;
 MEDIAWAVE, Djer, Hungary;
 ITF, Monastery, Tunisia;
 Golden Autumn, Slavutych, Ukraine;
 Festival of new musics Citta del Castello, Florence, Italy
 ORIENT, Tallinn, Estonia;
 Third International Festival of Sergey Kurekhin, St. Petersburg, Russia
 Forte, Riga, Latvia;
 Sergei Oskolkov & friends, St. Petersburg, Russia
 A CAPELLA, St. Petersburg, Russia
 CHRISTOFER SUMMER FESTIVAL, Vilnius, Latvia;
 MIDEM ASIA 96, Hong Kong;
 MIDEM 95, Barcelona, Spain;
 SXSW, Ostin, Texas, USA;
 LMW, London, Great Britain;
 RSMS, Sydney, Australia;
Fantasy 97
Prize for video clip of Fedor Bondarchuk "Road to Katmandu"
Anigraph 98
Grand prix for video clip of Fedor Bondarchuk "Road to Katmandu"

External links 
 Official website ENG
 
 Igor Kalinauskas's studio
 Igor Kalinauskas' official site
 Olga Tkachenko's official pages
 Fan site for the duet
 Facebook official page for the duet in RUS
 Duo Zikr's site in German
 official records sale on iTunes
 1000 Friends of Duo ZIkr Facebook page

Russian musical duos
Male–female musical duos
Vocal ensembles